The 9th World Sports Acrobatics Championships were held in Augsburg, Germany, in 1990.

Men's Tumbling

Overall

Somersault

Twisting

Men's Group

Overall

Balance

Tempo

Men's Pair

Overall

Balance

Tempo

Mixed Pair

Overall

Balance

Tempo

Women's Group

Overall

Balance

Tempo

Women's Pair

Overall

Balance

Tempo

Women's Tumbling

Overall

Somersault

Twisting

References

Acrobatic Gymnastics Championships
Acrobatic Gymnastics World Championships
International gymnastics competitions hosted by Germany
1990 in German sport